Matthew Joseph Morgan (born  December 3, 1980) is a former American football tackle who played for the St. Louis Rams and Buffalo Bills of the National Football League (NFL). He played college football at Pittsburgh.

Morgan went into coaching, and was assistant coach at Penn Hills High School for two seasons and at Gateway High School for three seasons, before taking the head coaching job at Plum High School in 2013.  The 2020 Plum football team finished the regular season undefeated and Greater Allegheny Conference champions, capturing their first conference title in four decades.  During the 2021 season, Plum was forced to forfeit a game for playing an ineligible player on several occasions.

References 

1980 births
Living people
Pittsburgh Panthers football players
American football offensive tackles
St. Louis Rams players
Buffalo Bills players
Players of American football from Pittsburgh